The white-vented whistler (Pachycephala homeyeri) is a species of bird in the family Pachycephalidae. It is found in the southern Philippines and a few islands of Malaysia. Its natural habitats are subtropical or tropical moist lowland forest and subtropical or tropical moist montane forest.

Taxonomy and systematics
The alternate name 'white-bellied whistler' should not be confused with the species of the same name, Pachycephala leucogastra. Formerly, some authorities considered the white-vented whistler to be a subspecies of the mangrove whistler.

Subspecies
Three subspecies are recognized:
 P. h. homeyeri – (Blasius, W., 1890): Found in south and southwestern Philippines; Sipadan and Pandanan Islands, off eastern Sabah (Malaysia)
 P. h. major – (Bourns & Worcester, 1894): Found on Cebu (Philippines)
 P. h. winchelli – (Bourns & Worcester, 1894): Originally described as a separate species. Found in west-central Philippines

References

white-vented whistler
Birds of the Philippines
white-vented whistler
white-vented whistler
Taxonomy articles created by Polbot